Justice Lawrence may refer to:

Charles B. Lawrence (judge) (1820–1883), chief justice of the Illinois Supreme Court
Edwin Lawrence (Michigan jurist) (1808–1885), associate justice of the Michigan Supreme Court

See also
Judge Lawrence (disambiguation)